Erygia reflectifascia is a moth of the family Erebidae found in India (Tamil Nadu).

References

Moths described in 1891
Erygia
Moths of Asia